Becoming Bond is an 2017 American documentary drama film that explores the early life and casting of Australian actor George Lazenby as James Bond in the film On Her Majesty's Secret Service, his eventual decision to leave the role, and the effect it all had on his career and the rest of his life. The film employs the use of re-enacted dramatizations of Lazenby's life interspersed with actual interview footage of him. The film was written, produced, and directed by Josh Greenbaum, and premiered on Hulu on May 20, 2017.

Plot
The story itself is told through an interview with Lazenby, with cutscenes to reenactments where actors lip-synch to or voiceover Lazenby's dialogue. Lazenby describes his birth as an at-risk infant and how his humiliation at being the only student to fail in his school grade and attend graduation without receiving his certificate made an impact on him to never fail at anything again.

After getting a job as a car mechanic, he noticed that the car salesmen seemed to have a much more glamorous life, so he convinced the dealership manager to let him try his hand at sales. After failing to sell any cars, he attended a course from the popular "How to Win Friends and Influence People" symposium, where the only lesson he recalls learning is "Listen first and let the other person do the talking." Pretty soon he was successful at the job and was the key contact for embassy staff vehicle transactions, which brought him in contact with the daughter of an Australian politician. When she moved to London, he followed as a steerage passenger, hoping to win her heart. Upon his arrival, he discovered she had abandoned him in pursuit of a player on the Oxford University cricket team. Fearing he had once again failed in life, his attempts to charm her set him on a path that would land him the role as one of the smoothest leading male characters in film history: James Bond, who always gets the girl in the end.

The Bond film entitled On Her Majesty's Secret Service is released in December 1969 to steady acclaim, box-office record sales and sends Lazenby into the path of one of Hollywood's next stars. Unfortunately, being James Bond meant surrendering his own sense of self, and he walked away from the fame and fortune that would have come with the role, after his one and only film in the franchise. Following a dwindling in his film career, Lazenby settled back in Australia, where he became a realtor, married, raised a family and led a happy and normal life.

In retrospect, Lazenby in the present day has found his peace in everything he did before and after Bond. Additionally, Lazenby was given much acclaim in modern times for his role as James Bond with On Her Majesty's Secret Service held in high regard and considered as one of the finest films in the franchise and the best by some.

Cast
 George Lazenby as himself  
Reenactment cast
 Josh Lawson as George
 Kassandra Clementi as Belinda
 Teressa Liane as June Green
 Landon Ashworth as Ken Gherety
 Nathan Lovejoy as Chook Warner
 Jane Seymour as Maggie
 Jeff Garlin as Harry Saltzman
 Jake Johnson as Peregrine Carruthers
 Dana Carvey as Johnny Carson

Reception
Becoming Bond has received positive reviews from critics. On the review aggregation website Rotten Tomatoes, it holds an 78% approval rating with an average rating of 6.51/10 based on 18 reviews; the critical consensus reads "Becoming Bond is an uproarious recreation of George Lazenby's colorful stint as Britain's greatest spy, evidencing that the gregarious Australian may be a greater raconteur than he was a 00". On Metacritic, which uses a weighted average, assigned the season a score of 65 out of 100 based on 4 reviews, indicating "generally favorable reviews".

See also
List of original programs distributed by Hulu

References

External links

American documentary films
Films directed by Josh Greenbaum
Hulu original films
James Bond in film
2017 films
2017 documentary films
2010s English-language films
2010s American films